Arthur Kent (July 2, 1920, New York City – January 26, 2009, Florence, South Carolina) was an American composer of popular songs, many of which he wrote in collaboration with lyricist Sylvia Dee.

Selected songs
"So They Tell Me" with lyricists Harold Mott and Jack Gale, sung by Frank Sinatra 1946
"You Never Miss the Water (Till the Well Runs Dry)," lyricist Paul Secon for the Mills Brothers 
"Don't Go to Strangers",  with Redd Evans and David Mann  recorded in 1960 by Etta Jones
"Take Good Care of Her", with lyricist Ed Warren, a Top Ten hit for  Adam Wade 
"I'm Coming Back to You", with Warren, sung by Julie London 1963  
"The End of the World", with lyricist Sylvia Dee, sung by Skeeter Davis 1963 
"Bring Me Sunshine", with Dee for Willie Nelson, and in the UK the theme tune for comedians Morecambe and Wise
 "I Taught Her Everything She Knows", with Dee, sung by Billy Walker
"Just Across the Mountain", with Johnny Mercer for Eddy Arnold 1968 
"Little Acorns", with Mercer, sung by Hank Locklin 1970
"Wonder When My Baby's Comin' Home," with lyricist Kermit Goell, sung by Barbara Mandrell

References

1920 births
2009 deaths
Musicians from New York City